Tipperary University Hospital is a public hospital located in Clonmel, County Tipperary, Ireland. It is managed by South/Southwest Hospital Group.

History
The hospital has it origins in the Clonmel Union Workhouse and Infirmary which was designed by George Wilkinson and opened in October 1853. The Sisters of Mercy managed the clinical operations of the infirmary from 1883. The infirmary evolved to become St. Joseph's Hospital, Clonmel and, after a major expansion, it re-opened as the Clonmel County Medical and Maternity Hospital in 1950.

Services
The hospital provides 318 beds, of which 217 are in-patient beds, 25 are designated for day cases, 25 for emergency department patients, and 2 for labour ward admissions, while a further 49 are reserved for psychiatric patients.

References

External links

Buildings and structures in Clonmel
Health Service Executive hospitals
Hospital buildings completed in 1853
1853 establishments in Ireland
Hospitals in County Tipperary
Hospitals established in 1853
19th-century architecture in the Republic of Ireland